The Pakistan Botanical Society is a learned society of professional botanists. It was established in 1968. Its headquarters are located in the Department of Biology at the University of Karachi and its current president is Ikram-ul-Haq.

Publications
The society publishes the Pakistan Journal of Botany bimonthly.

External links
 

Organisations based in Karachi
Botanical societies
Organizations established in 1968
Learned societies of Pakistan
Scientific organisations based in Pakistan
University of Karachi
1968 establishments in Pakistan